Long'an District is a district of the city of Anyang, Henan province, China.

Administrative divisions
As 2012, this district is divided to 6 subdistricts, 1 town, and 2 townships.
Subdistricts

Towns
Longquan

Townships
Dongfeng Township
Matoujian Township

References

County-level divisions of Henan